The H&E Paramotores Ziklon is a Spanish paramotor that was designed and produced by H&E Paramotores of Madrid for powered paragliding. Now out of production, when it was available the aircraft was supplied complete and ready-to-fly.

Design and development
The Ziklon was designed to comply with the US FAR 103 Ultralight Vehicles rules as well as European regulations. It features a paraglider-style wing, single-place accommodation and a single Per Il Volo Top 80  engine in pusher configuration with a reduction drive and a  diameter two-bladed wooden propeller, depending on the model.

As is the case with all paramotors, take-off and landing is accomplished by foot. Inflight steering is accomplished via handles that actuate the canopy brakes, creating roll and yaw.

Variants
Ziklon 99
Model with a Per Il Volo Top 80  engine in pusher configuration with a reduction drive and a  diameter two-bladed wooden propeller.
Ziklon 115
Model with a Per Il Volo Top 80  engine in pusher configuration with a 2.4:1 ratio reduction drive and a  diameter two-bladed wooden propeller.
Ziklon 125
Model with a Per Il Volo Top 80  engine in pusher configuration with a reduction drive and a  diameter two-bladed wooden propeller.

Specifications (Ziklon 115)

References

Ziklon
2000s Spanish ultralight aircraft
Single-engined pusher aircraft
Paramotors